San Luis Amatlán is a town and municipality in Oaxaca in south-western Mexico. The municipality covers an area of 170.96 km2. 
It is part of the Miahuatlán District in the south of the Sierra Sur Region.

As of 2005, the municipality had a total population of 3393.

References

Municipalities of Oaxaca